This article shows all participating men's volleyball squads at the 2006 Central American and Caribbean Games, held from July 15 to July 30, 2006 in Cartagena, Colombia.

Head Coach: Ludger Niles

Head Coach:

Head Coach: Samuels Blackwood

Head Coach: Jacinto Campechano

Head Coach: Jorge Azair

Head Coach: Carlos Cardona

Head Coach: Gideon Dickson

References

 Official Site

C
Mens Squads, 2006 Central American And Caribbean Games
Central American and Caribbean Games